Canadian High Commissions are Canadian diplomatic missions in Commonwealth states. They are the equivalent of embassies in non-Commonwealth states.

 List of Canadian High Commissioners to Australia 1939–present
 List of Canadian High Commissioners to Newfoundland 1941-1949
 List of Canadian High Commissioners to New Zealand 1940–present
 List of Canadian High Commissioners to the United Kingdom 1880–present
 List of Canadian High Commissioners to India 
 List of Canadian High Commissioners to Barbados 1966–present
 List of Canadian High Commissioners to Belize
 List of Canadian High Commissioners to Hong Kong ?-1997

High Commissioners of Canada
High Comm